The following is a list of regions on Mars given the name Terra (pl. Terrae). Most cover large, rugged areas, often including outflow channels, cratering, and "chaos terrain". They may be contrasted with the Planitia (e.g., Amazonis Planitia) and Mare (e.g., Mare Erythraeum), smoother regions of differing albedo.

Interactive Mars map

See also
 List of plains on Mars
 List of areas of chaos terrain on Mars

References

External links
 Mars features database, (MIT; 2000)
 Google Mars
 U.S. Government, Planetary names